Hecuba (also known as Hecabe) was the wife of Priam, king of Troy.

Hecuba may also refer to:
 Hecuba (play), by Euripides
 Hecuba (West play), a 1726 work by the British writer Benjamin West
 Hamlet oder Hekuba: der Einbruch der Zeit in das Spiel, a 1956 essay by Carl Schmitt
 Hécube, Op.177, a 1937 composition by Darius Milhaud
 Hecuba, a character from the program Passions
 Hecuba (band), from California
 108 Hecuba, an asteroid
 Hecuba, a peak in the Nilgiri mountains
 USS Hecuba (AKS-12), a ship